Arne Dankers (born June 1, 1980) is a Canadian speed skater.

Background
Dankers was born to Peter Dankers and Marja Verhoef, who are both Dutch. The family moved to Canada when he was two years old. Dankers graduated from the University of Calgary with a master's degree in Electrical Engineering and later completed a PhD at the Delft University of Technology.

Dankers was a member of the Canadian team that set the team pursuit world record of 3:39.69 in Calgary, Canada on November 12, 2005. The Canadian team, of which Dankers was a part, was not able to duplicate this performance at the 2006 Turin Olympics. The Italian team now holds the Olympic team pursuit record of 3:43.64.

2006 Winter Olympics
At the 2006 Olympics he participated in the following events:
 Speed Skating, Men's 1500 m
 Speed Skating, Men's 5000 m – 5th place
 Speed Skating, Men's 10000 m – 9th place
 Speed Skating, Men's Team Pursuit – Silver

Dankers placed 5th place in the 5000m men's speed skating final and his team won a silver medal in Men's team pursuit speed skating.

External links

References 

1980 births
Living people
Canadian male speed skaters
Speed skaters from Calgary
Speed skaters at the 2006 Winter Olympics
Olympic silver medalists for Canada
Olympic speed skaters of Canada
Canadian people of Dutch descent
Olympic medalists in speed skating
Medalists at the 2006 Winter Olympics
21st-century Canadian people